James Ian Gardiner (18 October 1928 – 15 April 1990) was a Scottish footballer, who played for East Fife, Motherwell, Raith Rovers, St Johnstone, Montrose and the Scotland national football team. He scored 125 goals in the top division of the Scottish Football League, and 217 goals in all competitions, during his career. He also represented the Scottish League once, scoring against the Irish League in a 5–1 win in 1954.

Gardiner died in Balbeggie on 15 April 1990, at the age of 61.

References

External links

1928 births
1990 deaths
Association football forwards
Scottish footballers
Scotland international footballers
Scotland B international footballers
Scottish Football League players
East Fife F.C. players
Motherwell F.C. players
Raith Rovers F.C. players
St Johnstone F.C. players
Montrose F.C. players
Scottish Football League representative players
Footballers from Perth and Kinross